Lech is a Polish masculine given name. Lech was the name of the legendary founder of Poland. Lech also appears as a surname, with 14,289 people having the name in Poland.

Given name 
 Lech, legendary founder of Poland
 Lech II, legendary ruler of Poland and son of Krakus
 Lech Bądkowski (1920–1984), Polish writer, journalist, publicist and Kashubian-Pomeranian activist
 Lech Gardocki (born 1944), Polish lawyer, judge and former First President of the Supreme Court of Poland
 Lech Garlicki (born 1946), Polish jurist and constitutional law specialist
 Lech Janerka (born 1953), Polish songwriter, vocalist, and bassist
 Lech Jęczmyk (born 1936), Polish publicist, essayist, writer and translator
 Lech Kaczyński (1949–2010), Politician of the party Prawo i Sprawiedliwość, former President of Poland
 Lech Kołakowski (born 1963), Polish politician
 Lech Kowalski (born 1951), British-born American filmmaker
 Lech Koziejowski (born 1949), Polish fencer and Olympic gold medalist
 Lech Kuropatwiński (born 1947), Polish politician
 Lech Łasko (born 1956), Polish volleyball player and Olympic gold medalist
 Lech Mackiewicz (born 1960), Polish actor, director and playwright
 Lech Majewski (film director) (born 1953), Polish film and theatre director, writer, poet, and painter
 Lech Ordon (1928–2017), Polish actor
 Lech Owron (1893–1965), Polish actor
 Lech Piasecki (born 1961), Polish racing cyclist
 Lech Pijanowski (1928–1974), Polish film critic, broadcaster, director, screenwriter and populiser of games
 Lech Rzewuski (1941–2004), Polish painter
 Lech Szczucki (1933–2019), Polish historian of philosophy and culture
 Lech Szymańczyk (born 1949), Polish politician
 Lech Trzeciakowski (1931–2017), Polish historian
 Lech Wałęsa (born 1943), Polish co-founder of the Solidarity movement and former President of Poland
 Lech Woszczerowicz (born 1940), Polish politician
 Lech Wyszczelski (born 1942), Polish military historian and author

Surname 
 Andrzej Lech (born 1946), Polish Olympic handball player
 Andrzej Jerzy Lech (born 1955), Polish artist and photographer
 Grzegorz Lech (born 1983), Polish footballer
 Joanna Lech (born 1984), Polish poet and writer
 Jacek Lech (1947–2007), Polish singer
 Piotr Lech (born 1968), Polish goalkeeper

See also 
 Lach (name)
 Lech (Bohemian prince) (died 805)
 Lech (river)
 Polish name
 Slavic names
 Lech (disambiguation)

References

Polish masculine given names
Given names